Çatakkaya can refer to:

 Çatakkaya, İspir
 Çatakkaya, Sivrice